Canada–Denmark relations are the current and historical relations between Canada and Denmark. Canada has an embassy in Copenhagen. Denmark has an embassy in Ottawa and a consulate-general in Toronto. Both countries are full members of NATO and the Arctic Council. Relations between the two countries have attracted attention in light of the dispute over Hans Island, which was resolved in 2022.

History
In 1928, the bilateral relations between Canada and Denmark were strengthened, when members of the Canadian National Railways met with Thomas Madsen-Mygdal.

The first treaty between Canada and Denmark was a visa requirements agreement, signed on 22 September and 14 October 1949. Both countries signed an agreement concerning taxes in 1956. Canada and Denmark agreed to cooperate with defence science in 1969. In 1983, a marine environmental, social and economic agreement was signed in Copenhagen.

In 2010, the Denmark–USA/Canada Program was launched. The programme aims the internationalization of Danish education programmes.

Hans Island

The island is claimed by both Canada and Greenland with the Kingdom of Denmark. In 1973 Canada and the Kingdom of Denmark ratified a treaty defining the border in the area. The treaty did not define the border at Hans Island as no agreement was made on this. In 1984, Tom Høyem, the Danish Minister for Greenland, raised the Danish flag on the island. On 25 July 2005, Canadian Defence Minister Bill Graham visited the island, sparking anger in Denmark. The Government of Denmark sent a letter of protest to Canada.
On 19 September 2009, both governments put in place a process to end the dispute. 

In January 2011, both countries were close to a resolution over the island. However, the border agreement signed in November 2012 did not contain a solution to the dispute.

On 10 June 2022, Canadian newspaper The Globe and Mail reported that the Canadian and Danish governments had settled on a border across the island, dividing it between the Canadian territory of Nunavut and the Danish constituent country of Greenland, to be formally unveiled on 14 June 2022.

High level visits

Crown Princess Margrethe (later Queen of Denmark) and her husband Prince Henrik visited Canada in September 1967. Queen Margrethe also visited Canada in 1991.  Crown Prince Frederik and Crown Princess Mary visited Ottawa and Toronto in 2014.
When Prince Joachim married Marie they spent their honeymoon in Canada. The first four days in Tofino, Vancouver Island and the rest in Montreal.

Expatriates

Danes in Canada
About 200,000 people in Canada are of Danish origin or birth. They mostly live in Ontario, Alberta and British Columbia.

New Denmark is a Canadian rural community in Victoria County, New Brunswick. The community derives its name from several Danish settlers who inhabited the area in 1872, eventually forming the largest and what would become the oldest Danish community in Canada; the Danish influence has diminished somewhat in recent decades due to out-migration.

See also
Jens Munk
Canadians of Danish descent
Danish Embassy, Ottawa
International Security Assistance Force
2011 military intervention in Libya
Canada–European Union relations
Comprehensive Economic and Trade Agreement
Denmark–United States relations – Including U.S. attempts to purchase Greenland

References

 

 
Denmark 
Bilateral relations of Denmark
Foreign relations of Greenland